Rohrbach in Oberösterreich was a town and capital of the district of Rohrbach in the Austrian state of Upper Austria. On May 1, 2015 Rohrbach was merged with neighboring community of Berg bei Rohrbach to the municipality Rohrbach-Berg.

Population

References

Cities and towns in Rohrbach District